Eburneana magna is a species of jumping spider in the genus Eburneana that mimics ants. The species has been identified from a holotype found in Ivory Coast.

Taxonomy and etymology
Eburneana magna is a species of jumping spider that was first named by Wanda Wesołowska and Tamás Szűts in 2001. It is one of over 500 species identified by Wesołowska. It is the type species of the genus Eburneana, one of many of spiders that mimics ants. The genus is named for Litus Eburneum, the Latin name for Ivory Coast, where the species was first identified. The species name is the Latin word for big, in reference to the relatively large size of the spider. In 2015, the genus was added to the subclade Saltafresia in the clade Salticoida based on the analysis of 8 genes. In 2017, it was added to the supergroup Hylloida by Jerzy Prószyński.

Description
Only the female has been described. It is covered with short grey hairs. While all examples are relatively large, the male of the genus is generally even larger than the female. For example, the male of the related species Eburneana scharffi has a carapace that is between  longer than the female.

The spider is distinguished from other members of genus by a large number of spigots on its spinneret and the structure of epigyne. It shares some similarities with other ant-mimicking jumping spiders, particularly the males that have front legs that are similar to members of the family Pelleninae.

Distribution
Eburneana magna is the only member of the genus that is endemic to the Ivory Coast. The only example identified to date was a single female specimen found on Mont Tonkoui in Tonkpi.

References

Citations

Bibliography

Endemic fauna of Ivory Coast
Salticidae
Spiders of Africa
Spiders described in 2001
Taxa named by Wanda Wesołowska